J.M.A. Armstrong High School is a secondary public school located in Salisbury, New Brunswick.

The school opened in the fall of 1981 and instructs students from grades 5 to 12. The high school and Salisbury Middle School share the same complex, half being a high school, and half being a middle school.

Notable alumni
Stacy Wilson - is a former captain of the Canadian national women's hockey team, head coach of the Bowdoin College women's ice hockey team.

References

External links
 JMA Armstrong High School - Official Website
Anglophone East School District Website

High schools in New Brunswick
Schools in Westmorland County, New Brunswick
Educational institutions established in 1981
Middle schools in New Brunswick
1981 establishments in Canada